The 1984 Major League Baseball season started with a 9-game winning streak by the eventual World Series champions Detroit Tigers who started the season with 35 wins and 5 losses and never relinquished the first place lead.

New commissioner
On March 3, 1984, Peter Ueberroth was elected by the owners as the sixth commissioner of baseball (replacing retiring commissioner Bowie Kuhn) and officially took office on October 1 of that year. As a condition of his hiring, Ueberroth increased the commissioner's fining ability from US$5,000 to $250,000. His salary was raised to a reported $450,000, nearly twice what Kuhn was paid.

Just as Ueberroth was taking office, the Major League Umpires Union was threatening to strike the postseason. Ueberroth managed to arbitrate the disagreement and had the umpires back to work before the League Championship Series were over.

Awards and honors
Baseball Hall of Fame
Luis Aparicio
Don Drysdale
Rick Ferrell
Harmon Killebrew
Pee Wee Reese

Other awards
Outstanding Designated Hitter Award: Dave Kingman (OAK)
Roberto Clemente Award (Humanitarian): Ron Guidry (NYY)
Rolaids Relief Man Award: Dan Quisenberry (KC, American); Bruce Sutter (STL, National).

Player of the Month

Pitcher of the Month

Statistical leaders

Standings

American League

National League

Postseason

Bracket

All-Star game
All-Star Game, July 10 at Candlestick Park: National League, 3–1; Gary Carter, MVP

Home Field Attendance

Television coverage

Events
April 7: Jack Morris of the Detroit Tigers threw a no-hitter against the Chicago White Sox at Comiskey Park in Chicago.
June 23: On a broadcast of NBC's Game of the Week between the Chicago Cubs and St. Louis Cardinals, Cubs second baseman Ryne Sandberg hits two crucial, game tying home runs off of Cardinals closer Bruce Sutter in both the bottom of the ninth and tenth innings. The Cubs would go on to win the game in eleven innings, by the score of 12–11. 
September 30: Mike Witt of the California Angels threw a perfect game against the Texas Rangers. He finished with 94 pitches and ten strikeouts.

Movies
The Natural

Deaths
March 18: Charley Lau
March 20: Stan Coveleski
August 14: Lynn McGlothen
August 25: Waite Hoyt
September 7: Joe Cronin
October 1: Walter Alston
October 26: Gus Mancuso
November 25: Ival Goodman

References

External links
1984 Major League Baseball season at ESPN
1984 Major League Baseball season schedule at Baseball Reference

 
Major League Baseball seasons